Dim Mak may refer to:

 Dim Mak, the "Touch of Death" pressure-points attacks in Wuxia martial arts
 Dim Mak (band), an American death-metal band
 Dim Mak Records, an American recording label